Cacostola leonensis is a species of beetle in the family Cerambycidae that was described by Dillon and Dillon in 1946 and occurs in Puerto Rico.

References

Cacostola
Beetles described in 1946